KNXV-TV (channel 15) is a television station in Phoenix, Arizona, United States, affiliated with ABC. It is owned by the E. W. Scripps Company alongside CW affiliate KASW (channel 61). Both stations share studios on 44th Street on the city's east side, while KNXV-TV's transmitter is located atop South Mountain. KNXV-TV's signal is relayed across northern Arizona through a network of low-power translators.

Originally established in 1979 as the Phoenix area's second independent station with part-time subscription television programming, channel 15 affiliated with Fox in 1986, then landed the ABC affiliation in 1995 as part of a group deal between Scripps and the network. In addition to network and syndicated programs, KNXV-TV has produced local newscasts since 1994, attaining critical acclaim for reporting including being the recipient of three George Foster Peabody Awards.

History

As an independent station (1979–1986)
In February 1975, pioneering UHF broadcaster Edwin Cooperstein, who had started New Jersey's WNJU-TV in the 1960s before moving to Phoenix, announced that the Federal Communications Commission (FCC) had granted a construction permit to his company, New Television Corp., to build a television station in Phoenix on UHF channel 15. It was expected to begin broadcasting within a year and was intended to place a heavy emphasis on news programming, airing three 90-minute newscasts at different times between 4 p.m. and midnight. The lone legacy of this intended format was the station's call sign, KNXV, standing for "Newswatch 15" (the "XV" stood for 15 in Roman numerals). Plans were soon delayed by the inability to secure financing in a difficult economy, and by the end of 1976, the station still had not been built. In 1977, funding problems continued to stand in the way of getting KNXV-TV on the air, leading Cooperstein and his investors to sell a majority of New Television Corp. to Byron Lasky's Arlington Corporation. Lasky would end up launching or purchasing three other stations: WTTO in Birmingham, Alabama; WCGV-TV in Milwaukee; and WQTV in Boston.

In late 1978, firm plans were made for a 1979 launch of the station. The catalyst and financial backer was Oak Industries, which would broadcast the ON TV subscription television service in evening hours while New Television would program the station during the day as a commercial independent, airing first-run and off-network syndicated shows and children's programs. KNXV-TV signed on September 9, 1979, more than four and a half years after the construction permit was granted. One of the station's most memorable early promotions featured the "Bluebird of Happinews", with the voice of Elroy "Buzz" Towers (who was voiced by an early station master control/videotape operator) in an invisible sky-blue helicopter taking jabs at local news on other stations.

In Phoenix, ON TV held telecast rights at various times to ASU sports, the Phoenix Suns, Phoenix Giants minor league baseball and Los Angeles Kings hockey. By July 1982, ON TV had 39,000 subscribers in Phoenix, but signs of trouble for the business were emerging rapidly. In 1981, the Suns signed a 13-year agreement to telecast games through American Cable, resulting in the launch of the Arizona Sports Programming Network; however, American Cable sub-licensed games to ON TV in part because they had not yet wired all of the metropolitan area. KNXV-TV also proved itself a tough partner for Oak's subscription service. The station resisted a request to expand ON TV to start before 7:00 p.m. on weekdays and 5:00 p.m. on weekends, while the station also threatened to stop airing ON TV's "adults only" late-night fare. ON TV took the station to court over its refusal to cede early evening hours, which generated 60 percent of the television station's revenue.

Phoenix was one of the first ON TV markets to show serious subscriber erosion. By April 1983, its subscriber base had dipped below 25,000, a drop of more than 35 percent. Oak Communications ultimately shuttered ON TV in Phoenix on May 4, 1983, resulting in the loss of 140 jobs. KNXV then became a full-time general entertainment independent station, relying on a movie library and those syndicated shows not already owned by KPHO-TV, the established independent in Phoenix, or the network affiliates.

Scripps purchase and Fox affiliation
After going full-time with the end of ON TV, potential buyers appeared for channel 15. Cooperstein rebuffed a $22 million bid from the Tribune Company and accepted a $30 million offer from Scripps-Howard in 1984, with the sale being finalized in 1985 after Scripps was required to divest itself of radio stations KMEO-AM-FM.

One new program on channel 15 in its first months with Scripps had much to do with its new owner. In mid-1985, KNXV began producing Friday Night at the Frights starring "Edmus Scarey" (portrayed by Ed Muscare), a series of decidedly campy B-movie wraparounds. Ed Muscare had previously hosted shows for another Scripps station, KSHB-TV in Kansas City. Stu Powell, general manager of KNXV in the mid-1980s and former KSHB-TV general manager, had convinced Muscare to work in Phoenix and coaxed Muscare out of retirement. Muscare resigned in September 1986, shortly before being arrested on charges of sexual battery with a minor stemming from an incident in Florida.

Under Scripps, KNXV began to purchase more recent sitcoms, often outbidding KPHO for strong shows. The station also became the over-the-air broadcaster of the Suns again; it lost the rights to televise the team's games to KUTP (channel 45) in 1988. After KPHO turned down an offer to affiliate with the fledgling Fox network, it approached KNXV. Channel 15 joined Fox at the network's inception on October 9, 1986; as Fox's first and only program was The Late Show Starring Joan Rivers, KNXV remained essentially independent. The station had a unique view of the development of the network, as general manager Powell, who later worked in Chicago, Pittsburgh, and Charlotte, also sat on Fox's first board of governors; he would remark of the early days, "The only definition of failure at Fox at that time was not trying things".

During this period, KNXV made steady gains. By 1990, channel 15 had surpassed KPHO in total day ratings, even though the station still produced no local newscasts, and it was regularly appearing as one of the top five Fox affiliates by ratings in the country. While KPHO attempted to woo Fox away with its existing news operation, KNXV retained the affiliation, having become by 1992 the second most successful Fox affiliate in ratings after KTXL in Sacramento, California.

As an ABC affiliate (1995–present)

On May 22, 1994, New World Communications signed a long-term groupwide affiliation agreement with Fox that would result in longtime CBS affiliate KSAZ-TV (channel 10, which New World was in the process of acquiring from Citicasters) becoming the Phoenix area's new Fox affiliate. The deal also affected the two other Fox stations owned by Scripps-Howard, KSHB-TV and WFTS-TV in Tampa. Just as importantly, however, New World also owned CBS affiliates switching to Fox in Detroit and Cleveland. CBS was highly interested in moving to the successful Scripps-owned ABC affiliates, WXYZ-TV and WEWS-TV, in these markets, which ABC estimated to generate half a rating point by themselves for World News Tonight.

Amid this backdrop, Scripps placed major pressure on ABC and insisted that the network affiliate with KNXV-TV as a condition of remaining with the Detroit and Cleveland stations, or else it would affiliate with CBS in those markets. This was not something to which ABC was initially amenable. Its Phoenix affiliate of nearly four decades, KTVK, was the market leader in news and seen by the network as one of its model affiliates. ABC network president Bob Iger wanted to keep KTVK, but Tom Murphy, the CEO of Capital Cities/ABC, felt that he had to be able to offer the ABC affiliation in Phoenix to Scripps if necessary to avoid potential long-term damage to the ABC television network. Scripps refused $25 million from ABC to "take Phoenix off the table", having been described by network executive Bryce Rathbone as "[having] a gun to their head". Meanwhile, KNXV general manager Raymond Hunt was receiving calls congratulating him on KNXV's new CBS affiliation, even though no such deal had been made.

On June 15, 1994, ABC officially gave KNXV-TV its affiliation for Phoenix, effective January 9, 1995, and agreed to affiliate with Scripps-owned stations in Tampa and Baltimore. KNXV was already in the process of building a local news department when the affiliation switch was announced; in September 1993, the station had hired its first news director, and the station's newly hired staff of 30 had reported to Phoenix in the weeks before the New World deal was announced. As a result of the switch and the consequent demand for more newscasts, the news staff swelled to 85, and the station delayed the launch of its newscast a month to August 1. KTVK's loss of the ABC affiliation was attributed to it being a standalone, family-run operation, while Scripps held substantial clout as a major broadcast chain.

Over the second half of 1994, ABC programming migrated from KTVK to KNXV in stages as the outgoing affiliate shed a variety of its soon-to-be former network's offerings. When KTVK launched a local morning newscast at the end of August, Good Morning America was the first ABC program to move to KNXV. KNXV then picked up World News Tonight and Nightline on December 12, the day after the Fox affiliation ended. The rest of ABC's programming moved to KNXV on January 9, 1995.

In 1999, the station moved to a new $31 million studio facility that included two studios and a helipad; KDRX-LP, the low-power Telemundo affiliate, then acquired KNXV's former building in 2001, allowing it to start producing its own local newscasts. (KDRX's first local news program was also produced at channel 15.) Scripps opted to centralize its advertising traffic operation at hubs in Phoenix and Tampa in 2009, choosing Phoenix as one of its westernmost properties at the time, allowing the traffic hub to stay open later.

On July 27, 2007, two news helicopters leased to KNXV and KTVK collided while covering a police pursuit in downtown Phoenix. All four people on both helicopters were killed, including KNXV pilot Craig Smith and photographer Rick Krolak.

KNXV-TV shut down its analog signal, over UHF channel 15, at 12:01 a.m. on June 12, 2009, the official date in which full-power television stations in the United States transitioned from analog to digital broadcasts under federal mandate. At 2 a.m. on that date, the station's digital signal relocated from its pre-transition UHF channel 56, which was among the high band UHF channels (52–69) that were removed from broadcasting use as a result of the transition, to its analog-era UHF channel 15.

Scripps has since expanded its operations in Phoenix and the state. Its 2015 acquisition of Journal Communications included KGUN-TV and KWBA-TV, the ABC and CW affiliates in Tucson. On March 20, 2019, Scripps announced that it would acquire Phoenix's affiliate of The CW, KASW, and seven other stations from Nexstar Media Group as part of that company's proposed acquisition of Tribune Media. This would create a new duopoly between KNXV and KASW, the third in the Phoenix market after Fox Television Stations' KSAZ-TV/KUTP and Meredith Corporation's KPHO-TV/KTVK. The sale was approved by the FCC on September 16 and was completed on September 19, 2019.

Local programming

News operation
In 1993, Scripps announced that it would start a local newscast for KNXV in 1994. It had already started a 9 p.m. local newscast for one of its other Fox affiliates, KSHB-TV in Kansas City, and the proposed newscast was intended to be unconventional to match the target demographic of Fox network programming. A news director had been hired in September 1993; the set was already under construction; and anchors and staff had reported to Phoenix in the first weeks of May 1994. However, the New World deal and consequent affiliation switch arrived late in the development of the newscast and forced a rethink of the product to go out on air and the long-term trajectory of KNXV's news department. The style was toned down slightly; a staff of 30 was expanded to 85; and what was once a 9 p.m. newscast slated to launch July 7 turned into a 10 p.m. newscast, News 15, that debuted on August 1, 1994. The new newscast was fast-paced with a high story count, and it was also the start of a rapid expansion to fit the needs of an ABC affiliate. A 6 p.m. newscast soon followed, with a 5 p.m. show added in December and 6 and 11 a.m. programs in January 1995.

The founding news director, Mary Cox, soon exited; she was replaced by Susan Sullivan, who created an environment focused on enterprise and investigative reporting that employees described as "utopian". Bob Rowe, a station manager "excommunicated" by Scripps to Phoenix, was just as influential in the early years of KNXV's news operation, laying the groundwork for a "no chit-chat" approach. The resulting news product attracted increased viewership: News 15 rose as high as second place at one point. It also led to critical acclaim: in 1995, channel 15 won the most regional Emmy Award nominations for a Phoenix station. However, after Sullivan left the station in 1996, Michael Kronley was installed as station manager from Charlotte ABC affiliate WSOC-TV: the investigative reports were discontinued, replaced by more live shots, and the station acquired a helicopter. KNXV and KPHO then both adopted the slogan "Live, Local, Late Breaking", requiring KPHO to alter its version and ultimately leading KNXV to adopt a new slogan, "We won't waste your time". Under Jeff Klotzman, channel 15's fourth news director, ratings generally fell for the station's newscasts; he resigned in 1998 and was replaced by Bob Morford, whose format tended to deemphasize reporters. A 2000 Columbia Journalism Review study of local newscasts nationwide gave KNXV the lowest rating in the history of the report, an "F", for its short stories lacking investigations and mentioned sources.

On April 1, 2009, Scripps joined with Fox Television Stations, owner of KSAZ-TV, to form Local News Service, a model for pooling newsgathering efforts for local news events in which each station provided employees to the pool service in exchange for the sharing of video. KPHO-TV eventually joined the Phoenix LNS agreement shortly after the announcement. By 2020, all four English-language television newsrooms in Phoenix shared a helicopter.

In the 2010s, KNXV steadily expanded its news product to additional time slots. In 2012, KNXV relaunched an 11 a.m. newscast, and it added weekend morning news in 2013, and a 6:30 weeknight half-hour in 2014, among other new newscasts. After acquiring KASW, Scripps launched extended morning, midday, and 9 p.m. newscasts on that station over the course of 2020.

In the mid-2010s, KNXV also became a leader at digital news within the Scripps group, particularly under the leadership of Chris Kline, who was promoted to news director from digital director. It was the first station in the company to launch a channel on Roku, later expanded throughout the group, and the use of a "digital-first" newsroom methodology helped lead to ratings increases for channel 15's newscasts.

KNXV-TV has won three George Foster Peabody Awards. The first, in 2007, was for "Security Risks at Sky Harbor", which exposed lapses in security at the airport overnight. The station won a second in 2012 for "Ford Escape: Exposing a Deadly Defect", which led to a recall of SUVs, and a third in 2020 for reporter Dave Biscobing's investigation, "Full Disclosure", on the state of Brady lists in the state, which also received an Alfred I. duPont–Columbia University Award and The Hillman Prize. Another Biscobing report, "Politically Charged", won a 2021 George Polk Award.

Non-news programming
KNXV-TV also airs one non-news local program: Sonoran Living, a long-running late morning lifestyle program which debuted in 2000. It is broadcast each weekday at 9 a.m. and hosted by Susan Casper and Terri Ouellette.

Notable on-air staff
 Lisa Fletcher – anchor (2002–2007)
 Craig Fouhy – sports director
 Lori Jane Gliha – former weekend anchor/reporter
 Tony Kovaleski – reporter (1994–1997)
 Kinsey Schofield – anchor/reporter (2016–2017)
 Bob Woodruff – former reporter

Technical information

Subchannels
The station's digital signal is multiplexed:

KNXV's first subchannel offering was a traffic subchannel, launched in 2008. In 2011, subchannel 15.2 began carrying the Live Well Network; LWN was replaced with classic television network Antenna TV on January 1, 2014.

The main 61.1 subchannel of KASW is also broadcast on the KNXV-TV multiplex; KASW, Phoenix's high-power ATSC 3.0 (NextGen TV) station, carries KNXV-TV in that format.

Translators
KNXV-TV is broadcast on these translators in northern and northwestern Arizona:

 Big Sandy Valley: K27DA-D
 Bullhead City: K04GT-D
 Camp Verde: K23FZ-D
 Cottonwood: K33NZ-D, K34EE-D
 Dolan Springs: K31PA-D
 Flagstaff: K24KS-D
 Golden Valley: K27NT-D
 Kingman: K30LL-D
 Lake Havasu City: K24NG-D
 Meadview: K21NQ-D
 Moccasin: K35EE-D
 Prescott: K19KV-D
 Needles, etc., CA: K31HY-D

KNXV did not have any translator coverage until 1989, when it signed on a translator in Flagstaff. When it became an ABC affiliate in 1995, it replaced KTVK on some transmitters in Mohave County's translator network, the largest in the state. The second transmitter in Cottonwood rebroadcast KASW prior to its ATSC 3.0 conversion.

References

External links
 

ABC network affiliates
Antenna TV affiliates
Laff (TV network) affiliates
Court TV affiliates
E. W. Scripps Company television stations
NXV-TV
Television channels and stations established in 1979
1979 establishments in Arizona
ON TV (TV network)